Die Fallers – Die SWR Schwarzwaldserie (until 2011: "Die Fallers – Eine Schwarzwaldfamilie") is a German television series produced by the Südwestrundfunk about the life of a fictional family on a farm in the Black Forest. Its current timeslot on SWR Fernsehen is Sundays at 19:15.

It features, among others, the Black Forest resident and actor, Martin Wangler who has been with the show since 2007.

See also
List of German television series

References

External links
 

1994 German television series debuts
1990s German television series
2000s German television series
2010s German television series
2020s German television series
German-language television shows